Eupithecia marginata is a moth in the family Geometridae. It is found from Cyprus through the northern Caucasus (Daghestan), Armenia, Azerbaijan, Iran, Afghanistan, Uzbekistan, Tajikistan and Kyrgyzstan to south-eastern Kazakhstan (the Tien-Shan Mountains) and north-western China (Xinjiang).

References

Moths described in 1892
marginata
Moths of Europe
Moths of Asia